P400 may refer to:
 P400 class patrol vessel
 P-400, the export model of P-39 Airacobra fighter